Olsen Brothers are a Danish rock/pop music duo, formed by brothers Jørgen (born 15 March 1950) and Niels "Noller" Olsen (born 13 April 1954), both from Odense, who won the Eurovision Song Contest 2000. They formed their first band, The Kids, in 1965. The Kids warmed up for The Kinks in the K.B. Hallen in 1965 and released their first single in 1967.

Career
Both Jørgen and Niels Olsen participated in the musical Hair in the Cirkusbygningen in Copenhagen March 1971, and went on tour afterwards through Denmark, Norway and Sweden.

The Olsen Brothers' first album was released in 1972 and in total they have released 13 albums. Some of the biggest hit singles include "Angelina" (1972), ”For What We Are” (1973), "Julie" (1977), "San Francisco" (1978), "Dans Dans Dans" (1979), "Marie, Marie" (1982), "Neon Madonna" (1985), ”Wings Of Love” (2000), "We Believe In Love" (2001), "Look Up Look Down" (performed with Cliff Richard) (2009) and "Brothers To Brothers" (2013).

The Olsen Brothers have sold approx 3.2 million albums, 1.5 million singles and 2.7 million compilations.
They have a two-voice harmony and among their “fans” are Sir Cliff Richard and Björn Ulvaeus who both call the Olsen Brothers the "European Everly Brothers”.

Dansk Melodi Grand Prix and Eurovision participation
The Olsen Brothers and on occasions Jørgen Olsen on his own took part in a number of annual competitions known as Dansk Melodi Grand Prix the winner of which would represent Denmark in the Eurovision Song Contest.

DMGP 2000 and Eurovision Song Contest 2000
They won the annual Dansk Melodi Grand Prix song competition in 2000 in Copenhagen and went on to represent Denmark in the Eurovision Song Contest 2000 in Stockholm. where they won with the song "Fly on the Wings of Love" (translated from the Danish "Smuk som et Stjerneskud" (literally translated, "Beautiful as a Shooting Star"). At one stage, they sold 100,000 copies in one day, in Denmark. They became the second Danish act to win the competition. On the day of their victory, Jørgen Olsen was 50 years and 61 days of age, making him the oldest artist to win the contest. However, he only held the record for one year as Dave Benton triumphed in 2001 at the age of 50 years and 101 days. The combined ages of The Olsen Brothers make them the oldest aged act ever to win the contest.

They opened the Eurovision Song Contest 2001 in Copenhagen with a short reprise of their winning song from the previous year, followed by a full performance of their new release "Walk Right Back".

Later years
In 2005 for the first time since their victory, they re-entered the Danish Melodi Grand Prix, the national pre-selection for the Eurovision contest, with the song "Little Yellow Radio".  It was widely reported that they hoped to repeat their triumph; however this time they had to settle for second place, finishing behind Jakob Sveistrup.

Their song Fly on the Wings of Love was nominated as one of the 14 finalists for the Congratulations: 50 Years of the Eurovision Song Contest held in Copenhagen, Denmark on 22 October 2005. They performed the song in the event finishing 6th overall from 14 songs. The winner was "Waterloo" from  ABBA

In 2019, the brothers called a hiatus to their musical career after Niels was diagnosed with brain cancer. However, Niels was declared cancer free by the end of 2020 in a victory that was described as "against the odds", not ruling out returning to music in the future.

Discography

Albums
 Olsen (1972)
 For What We Are (1973)
 For the Children of the World (1973)
 Back on the Tracks (1976)
 You're the One (1977)
 San Francisco (1978)
 Dans - Dans - Dans (1979)
 Rockstalgi (1987)
 Det Stille Ocean (1990)
 Greatest and Latest (1994)
 Angelina (1999)
 Wings of Love (2000)
 The Story of Brødrene Olsen (2000)
 Rockstalgi (2001)
 Neon Madonna (2001)
 Walk Right Back (2001)
 Songs (2002)
 Weil Nur Die Liebe Zählt (2003)
 More Songs (2003)
 Our New Songs (2005)
 Celebration (2005)
 Respect (2008)
 Wings of Eurovision (2010)
 Brothers to Brothers (2013)

Singles
(Selective)
 "Angelina" (1972)
 "Julie" (1977)
 "San Francisco" (1978)
 "Dans dans dans" (1979)
 "Marie, Marie" (1982)
 "Neon Madonna" (1985)
 "Fly on the Wings of Love" (2000)
 "Wings of Eurovision" (2011)

See also
Dansk Melodi Grand Prix
Dansk Melodi Grand Prix winners

References

Danish pop music groups
Eurovision Song Contest winners
Eurovision Song Contest entrants for Denmark
Eurovision Song Contest entrants of 2000
Dansk Melodi Grand Prix contestants
Dansk Melodi Grand Prix winners
Sibling musical duos
Musical groups established in 1972